General Sir John Saunders Sebright, 6th Baronet (19 October 1725 – 23 February 1794) was the sixth Sebright baronet, an officer in the British Army and a Member of Parliament.

Sir John was a younger son of Sir Thomas Sebright, 4th Baronet and Henrietta Dashwood and was educated at Westminster School. In 1761 he succeeded his elder brother to the baronetcy and the Beechwood Park estate in Hertfordshire.

Sir John was colonel of the 83rd Regiment of Foot from 1758 to 1760, and then the 52nd Regiment of Foot, from 1760 to 1762. In 1762 he was promoted to the Colonelcy of the 18th (Royal Irish) Regiment of Foot, a position he held until his death. He was promoted full general on 20 November 1782.

He was elected MP for Bath in 1763, was defeated in 1774, but returned in a by-election a few months later, sitting until 1780.

He was a close friend of the Irish statesman and writer Edmund Burke. In 1765, on a visit to Sebright's home at Beechwood Park Burke came across a considerable number of medieval Irish manuscripts in the library. The manuscripts had been given to Sebright's father by the antiquary and philologist Edward Lhuyd who had acquired them on a tour of Ireland in 1700. In 1786, these were bequeathed to the library of Trinity College Dublin and formed the foundation of the Irish manuscript collections there. The manuscripts presented by Sebright included the Yellow Book of Lecan and the Book of Leinster.

In 1766, he had married Sarah Knight, daughter of Edward Knight and Elizabeth James, and had 2 sons and 2 daughters. Their eldest son, John, inherited the baronetcy. Their daughter Henrietta Sebright (DOB. 6 May 1770) married Henry Lascelles, 2nd Earl of Harewood.

References

1725 births
1794 deaths
People educated at Westminster School, London
52nd Regiment of Foot officers
Members of the Parliament of Great Britain for English constituencies
British MPs 1761–1768
British MPs 1768–1774
British MPs 1774–1780
Sebright, 06th Baronet
Royal Irish Regiment (1684–1922) officers
British Army generals